Changhe, officially Jiangxi Changhe Automobile Co Ltd, is a Chinese automobile manufacturer based in Jingdezhen, Jiangxi province, China.

Currently a majority-owned subsidiary of a large, state-owned automaker, BAIC, Changhe was previously engaged in a joint venture with Suzuki Motor Corporation of Japan, and some of the products it manufactures carry the Suzuki brand.

It may be a partner in the lesser of the two Suzuki joint ventures in China, and in the span of six years from 2008-2014 Changhe underwent a series of ownership changes and mergers that saw it transform from a subsidiary of a sedentary maker of military aircraft to a neglected division of a struggling, second-rate automaker (Chang'an) already overburdened with excess production lines for Suzuki microvans at a time when consumers in third- and fourth-tier cities were snapping up cheap and cheerful sedans and hatchbacks. As of 2014, Changhe's prospects look brighter having been merged with a different state-owned automaker (BAIC) serving first-tier cities but looking to expand into the faster growing interior of the country.

Making cars and microvans, small trucks and vans for commercial purposes, Changhe has an estimated 200,000 (227,000 to 260,000) units/year production capacity as of 2010. Production capacity figures may consider engines and vehicles as discrete.

History

A subsidiary of the Aviation Industry Corporation of China (AVIC) until 2010, perhaps it was the dictate of the Chinese government that prompted a large, state-owned automaker to take Changhe under its wing in a 2009 merger. Between that year and 2013, Chang'an held ownership of the company but was unable to boost growth prompting another merger with a more competent, state-owned partner, BAIC.

Having always been a smaller, dynamic vehicle manufacturer, Changhe was well established by 1973, the year trial production of buses began. Originally only making buses, the introduction of a small passenger vehicle (the Suzuki Carry ST90V) began in 1982 and sparked a long relationship with this Japanese automaker. Currently, Changhe companies make both Suzuki and Changhe-branded vehicles. In 1995, it entered a legal partnership with Suzuki forming a joint venture, Jiangxi Changhe-Suzuki Automobile Co Ltd. This JV does not make all the Suzuki-branded automobiles sold on the Chinese market as some are produced by another Chinese joint venture, Changan Suzuki. Imported models are marketed by Suzuki Motor (China) Investment Co Ltd.

Suzuki may currently be unhappy with its Chinese partners. Despite being an early entrant in the Chinese auto market, this Japanese company has lackluster sales in the country. Suzuki's efforts to change the situation by merging its two joint ventures—since Chinese business law does not allow any foreign company more than two—have so far been stymied by its Chinese partners, who instead hope Suzuki will improve their situation. The Chinese state may also not want new foreign-Chinese joint auto-making ventures at this time. An effort to sell the entire Suzuki model range at unified dealerships fell through in 2008. (This may have been tried again in 2010.)

Changhe-Suzuki's first products were versions of the Suzuki Carry microvans and trucks. As of 2010, microvan products include the Suzuki Wagon R (called the Big Dipper and in )  and the newer Suzuki Landy. In 2006, Changhe themselves introduced the new microvan CH6390 Freedom (also called Friend), which has Suzuki underpinnings but a Changhe-designed body.

While microvans continue to be a core product, several recently introduced small cars have expanded the company's offerings. These include the subcompact Changhe Ideal (first seen in October 2003), a self-developed car albeit with styling by Bertone and some Suzuki technology. The Suzuki Liana is also offered. While lower-end Changhes depend on common, Chinese-built engines also used by a variety of other local brands,  Changhe builds the Suzuki K12B and K14B engines for use in higher-end versions. These have seen use in a variety of Changhe products, including the Suzuki Wagon R, Liana, and Landy, as well as the Freedom and Ideal.

Export
Changhe has exported to some European and South American nations. These exports may be in the form of complete knock-down kits and are likely fitful and sporadic.

Latin America
Some Changhe models are sold in Brazil and Uruguay under the brand name Effa, and here the Ideal has been renamed the M100. Total Brazilian sales of the Ideal in 2010 were a reported 426 units. In Venezuela, the first Latin American country to receive a Changhe product (2007), the official dealer of the Changhe Ideal was Cinascar, but this model is no longer listed on Cinascar's website. In Peru and/or Colombia, Faga Motors sells various Changhe microvans.

Europe
Italian importer Martin Motors rebadges and sells the Changhe Landy as a Martin Motors Coolcar. The Ideal is known in Italy as the Martin Ideal 1000.

The Ideal is also marketed in the Ukraine.

IPO
Listed on the Shanghai Stock Exchange or Shenzhen Stock Exchange in 2001, Changhe was delisted in 2008 prior to its 2009 sale.

All models 
 Changhe A6
 Changhe Beidouxing (Changhe Big Dipper)
 Changhe Freedom M50

Former models 
 Changhe Ideal
 Changhe Freedom
 Changhe Freedom M60
 Changhe Freedom M70
 Changhe Fuyun
 Changhe Haitun
 Changhe Q25
 Changhe Q35
 Changhe Q7

 Changhe Changlingwang (CH6353)/ Changhe CH6321B

Production bases
Changhe locates its production in Jiangxi Province, at Jingdezhen City and Jiujiang City, and in the capital of Anhui province, Hefei. Engines are made at the Jiujiang location, and all three production bases assemble cars.

See also

BAIC Group
Changhe Ideal

References

External links
 Changhe Official Site

BAIC Group divisions and subsidiaries
Car manufacturers of China
Vehicle manufacturing companies established in 1970
Truck manufacturers of China